Hampton Roads Transit (HRT), incorporated on October 1, 1999, began through the voluntary merger of PENTRAN (Peninsula Transportation District Commission) on the Virginia Peninsula and TRT (Tidewater Regional Transit a.k.a. Tidewater Transit District Commission) in South Hampton Roads and currently serves over 22 million annual passengers within its  service area around Hampton Roads. The purpose of the HRT is to provide reliable and efficient transportation service and facilities to the Hampton Roads community.

Hampton Roads is located in southeastern Virginia. The Hampton Roads metropolitan area has a population of 1.6 million. Its service area consists of the cities of Norfolk, Virginia Beach, Chesapeake, Portsmouth, Hampton, Newport News, Williamsburg (Colonial Williamsburg) and the town of Smithfield. The entire service area population is 1.3 million. HRT also serves the area's major college campuses of Christopher Newport University, Hampton University, Norfolk State University, Old Dominion University, Virginia Peninsula Community College, and Tidewater Community College.

Effective January 1, 2012, the City of Suffolk, Virginia chose to withdraw from the Transportation District Commission of Hampton Roads and since, HRT no longer provides transit services within Suffolk. However, a couple HRT routes do connect with the Suffolk Transit service, which is provided by Virginia Regional Transit.

Governance 
Hampton Roads Transit is governed by the Transportation District Commission of Hampton Roads (TDCHR). The TDCHR was established in accordance with Chapter 45 of Title 15.2 of the Code of Virginia, as amended, referred to as the Transportation District Act of 1964 and by ordinances adopted by the governing bodies of its components governments.

The Transportation District Commission of Hampton Roads, HRT's governing body, consists of 13 members, one elected official and one citizen representative from each city served by Hampton Roads Transit, and the chairman of the Commonwealth Transportation Board (CTB), or a designee. The six Hampton Roads cities that participate rotate the chairmanship each year. The Honorable Richard W. "Rick" West (Chesapeake) is the current chairman.

There are five established committees that provide input to the governing body. These committees are listed below:
Executive Committee,
Audit/Budget Review Committee,
Operations & Oversight,
Planning and New Start Development,
Paratransit Committee, and
Commission Effectiveness (Ad hoc).

Leadership 
William E. Harrell is the current president and CEO of Hampton Roads Transit. Harrell went to Hampton Roads Transit from Chesapeake, Virginia, where he was the city manager since June 2007. Harrell replaced interim CEO Phillip A. Shucet on April 2, 2012.

Phillip A. Shucet was hired in February 2010 as an interim CEO to help complete construction of The Tide light rail while the company searches for a permanent replacement for long-time executive director Michael Townes. Townes was pressured by the board of directors and ultimately agreed to step down after the revelation of a $100 million cost overrun and a one-year delay on Norfolk's light-rail starter line, which has been named "The Tide". Shortly previously, Townes had been criticized for his handling of an employee embezzlement scheme. While he had not been directly involved in the earlier problem, a majority of the board members cited poor management and communication on his part in calling for him to step down.

Funding 
Hampton Roads Transit has approximately $30,000,000 dedicated revenue source from the Commonwealth of Virginia. Additional funding for service is provided with federal, state and local funding provided by member jurisdictions and farebox revenues. Local funding is provided based on the Cost Allocation Agreement – each city establishes how much service will be provided within its borders based on how much it is willing to pay for those services after all federal, state, and farebox revenues are applied. This means that the numbers of routes, service frequency, and service coverage areas as operated by Hampton Roads Transit are determined in each city during the annual budgetary cycle.

Corporate timeline 
NOTE: This section begins with the introduction of rubber-tired buses to the transit operations in Hampton and Newport News, following many years of public transit service performed earlier and during the transition by horse-drawn and electrically powered streetcars utilizing rails embedded in the streets and roads of the area.

Bus fleet 
The HRT fleet inventory as of January 2020, consisted of 294 vehicles, including 267 diesel buses, 37 hybrid buses and 10 trolley-style buses. The majority of the fleet, a total of 280 buses, were manufactured by Gillig and Novabus. The HRT fleet also includes 7 Novabus buses, 12 Optima buses and 10 Trolley-style buses manufactured by Chance. HRT acquired 11 Gillig hybrids in June 2011 to replace the Chance trolleys in the Summer of 2014. HRT has required to buy 7 Novabus which they are contracted to the Elizabeth River Crossings and to be using for Routes 44, 45 and 47.

Hampton Roads Transit's Bus Fleet were originally decorated with all white buses with a two line blue & green wave from the system's former logo which is similar to math's approximate (≈) symbol. New buses since 2006 have a wave going from the back, then becomes smooth through the front and have frameless windows. All Hybrids and the two 2006 Optima Opus' are in the blue background. All MAX buses have a silver background with sky blue & solid blue wave colors. Select buses which had the two-line wave logo have been repainted with the newer back wave design and the exterior window rows are painted black around the windows to resemble the newer buses. Since 2012, several buses were repainted into the silver/blue wave style like the MAX brand with the agency's new stripe logo. This is the current fleet design

On July 18, 2011, it was announced that the Commonwealth of Virginia has signed an umbrella contract with New Flyer Industries for the provision of buses to any Virginia transit authority. It remains to be seen whether or not the contract will include buses for HRT, but highly unlikely due to their contract for Gillig buses.

Retired fleet

Light rail fleet 
The Tide Light Rail began service on August 19, 2011, with nine of the trainsets entering to revenue service.

Other fleet 
HRT has three ferries, with two operating in the peak periods. HRT owns a total of 33 paratransit vans. HER is also leasing an additional 54 paratransit vans from its contractor to meet service requirements.

Primary services 
HRT operates nearly 60 local fixed routes and seven express bus routes in the region.

Route list 
Southside Routes
 1 Granby Street
 2 Hampton Boulevard
 3 Chesapeake Boulevard
 4 Church Street
 5 Willoughby
 6 South Norfolk
 8 Tidewater Drive
 9 Sewells Point Road
 11 Colonial Avenue
 12 Indian River Road
 13 Campostella Road
 14 Battlefield Boulevard
 15 Military Highway
 18 Ballentine Boulevard
 20 Virginia Beach Boulevard
 21 Little Creek Road
 22 Haygood
 23 Princess Anne Road
 24 Kempsville Road
 25 Newtown Road
 26 Lynnhaven Mall
 27 Northampton Boulevard
 29 Great Neck Road/Lynnhaven Parkway
 33 General Booth Boulevard
 36 Holland Road
 41 Cradock
 43 Parkview
 44 Midtown
 45 Portsmouth Boulevard
 47 High Street
 50 Academy Park
 57 Deep Creek
 58 Bainbridge Boulevard

VB WAVE Routes
 30 Atlantic Avenue Shuttle
 31 Aquarium and Campgrounds Shuttle
 35 Bayfront Shuttle

Peninsula Routes
 64 Smithfield
 101 Kecoughtan
 102 Queen Street
 103 Shell Rd
 104 Newsome Park
 105 Briarfield Road
 106 Warwick Boulevard
 107 Warwick Boulevard/Denbigh Boulevard
 108 Warwick/Lee Hall
 109 Buckroe
 110 Big Bethel Road/Thomas Nelson Community College
 111 Patrick Henry Mall/Thomas Nelson Community College
 112 Jefferson Avenue
 114 Mercury Boulevard
 115 Fox Hill Road
 117 Phoebus
 118 Armistead Avenue
 120 Mallory
 121 Williamsburg

Peninsula Commuter Routes
 403 Buckroe Shopping Center
 405 Buckroe Shopping Center/Newport News Transit Center
 414 Newport News Transit Center/Jefferson/Oakland
 415 Newport News Transit Center/Denbigh
 430 Denbigh Fringe

MAX Express Routes
 919 Virginia Beach-Naval Station
 922 Chesapeake-Virginia Beach-Naval Station Norfolk
 960 Virginia Beach-Norfolk
 961 Newport News-Hampton-Norfolk
 966 Silverleaf-Newport News
 967 Norfolk-Virginia Beach-Chesapeake-Newport News
 972 Newport News Shipyard-Tidewater Community College (Virginia Beach Campus)

Other services

Paratransit 
Hampton Roads Transit provides ADA Paratransit service, and is available within 3/4 of a mile of regularly scheduled bus routes. Fare is $3.50. Certification and reservations are required. Reservation hours are from 8 a.m. until 5 p.m. daily. Reservations must be made no later than 5:00 PM the day before you need transportation and you can reserve a ride up to 3 days in advance, at this time.

Traffix 
Traffix is a grant-funded program provided by Hampton Roads Transit. It encourages citizens throughout Hampton Roads to use alternative forms of transportation that reduces use of single occupancy vehicles. Traffix oversees and promotes regional commuter initiatives, including carpooling and remote work, by reaching out to area employers. Some of its key clients include the U.S. Navy, Northrop Grumman, Wal-mart, and Canon. To date, Traffix has removed nearly 800 vehicles off the road and has saved consumers over 600,000 gallons of gas and over $1.8 million in vehicle related expenses.

Ferry service 

HRT's paddle wheel ferry is a system of one 150-passenger and two 149-passenger paddle wheel ferry boats: Elizabeth River Ferry III, Elizabeth River Ferry IV and Elizabeth River Ferry V. Retired ferries include the James C. Echols and Elizabeth River Ferry II. The Ferry travels between North Landing and High Street in Portsmouth and downtown Norfolk at Waterside Dsitrict and Harbor Park. Harbor Park is only serviced during Norfolk Tides baseball home games.

The ferry operates every 30 minutes, with additional 15-minute service at peak times on weekends from Memorial Day to Labor Day. The Ferry is wheelchair accessible and allows boarding passengers to board with their bicycles. The general cost to board the ferry is $2.00 for adults, and $1.00 with eligibility ID for youth (age 17 and under), seniors (age 65 and older), and disabled patrons with eligible ID. Round-trip passes may be purchased for $4.00 for adults, with no round-trip option currently available for youth, senior, or disabled patrons. 1-day passes may be purchased as well for $4.50 for adults and $2.25 for youth, seniors, and disabled patrons with eligible ID. Exact fare is required, the crew and fare boxes can not make change.

The ferry's High Street dock is three blocks from Downtown Portsmouth's bus transfer area at County St & Court St.

Plans to introduce up to 4 new ferries have been announced by HRT. 2 of these announced ferries are currently in service, Elizabeth River Ferry IV and Elizabeth River Ferry V.

Virginia Beach Wave 
The VB Wave runs through the main areas of the Virginia Beach Oceanfront. Service runs from May through September.

Route 30 Atlantic Ave (May 1-October 2 8am-2am, About every 15 minutes) which serves all the stops along the Atlantic Avenue boardwalk, This includes the Virginia Beach Surf & Rescue Museum, the Virginia Beach Fishing Pier, plus the north beaches HRT transfer.

Route 31 Museum Express – (Daily, Memorial Day-Labor Day 9:30 AM until 11:10 PM, About every 15 minutes) Serves the Virginia Aquarium, Ocean Breeze Waterpark, Owl Creek Municipal Tennis Center, Holiday Trav-L-Park Campground, and KOA Campground.

Route 35 provides service from Arctic & 19th to Shore Drive & Vista Circle. It serves the Oceanfront, First Landing State Park, North End beaches, Chesapeake Bay beaches and Bayfront restaurants. The route runs from May 21 to October 1 all season long. This route runs daily from 8am to midnight for every 30 minutes from Memorial Day to Labor Day and every weekend from 8am to midnight for every 30 minutes from September 8 to October 1.

Former Route 32 Shoppers Express – (Daily, Memorial Day-Labor Day 10am-9pm, About every hour) Served the Shops at Hilltop, and ended at Lynnhaven Mall.

MAX (Metro Area Express) 

The MAX is the first regional express service connecting all of Hampton Roads. The bus service uses dedicated Gillig buses equipped with coach-style seating to make a more comfortable ride. All MAX buses are equipped with Wi-Fi. The routes connect area Park and Ride lots to Downtown Norfolk and other major employment locations in the area. There are two other express routes (Routes 64 and 121) that are not branded as MAX routes, although Route 121 often uses MAX buses.

The Tide Light Rail 

The Tide, Norfolk's Light Rail System, runs from Eastern Virginia Medical School through downtown Norfolk to Newtown Road (near Sentara Leigh Memorial Hospital).
The Groundbreaking Ceremony was held on December 8, 2007. Primary construction began in early 2008, the first of nine train sets arrived on October 6, 2009, and the Tide became fully operational on August 19, 2011.

Recent Projects 
In 2008, the long-standing central bus transfer area at Monticello Avenue and Charlotte Street was moved to the Cedar Grove lot on Monticello Avenue north of Virginia Beach Blvd., to accommodate the Wachovia development on Monticello Avenue. In 2016, it was moved again to a new Downtown Norfolk Transportation Center (DNTC) indoor terminal at 434 St. Paul's Blvd., closer to the main downtown district and the Tide's Monticello station. As of 2018, Greyhound is planned to move into the facility, as its old terminal is being taken for redevelopment, though there is concern as to whether the new facility will be able to accommodate the intercity service. A suggestion by Harrell to move it to Amtrak's new Harbor station has at this point not been pursued.

Projects under development

Virginia Beach Extension Study 
The Virginia Beach Extension Study was started in 2009 in an effort to bring a right-of-way rapid transit line to Virginia Beach using a former freight rail track, most likely to connect the current The Tide light rail from Newtown Road Station. The studied modes are Bus Rapid Transit and Light Rail.

Alternatives
The study originally considered three alternatives with a fourth added from the City Council of Virginia Beach. Distances are the number of miles from the Newtown Road Station.

 Virginia Beach Town Center: 3 miles' (Alternative added and eventually chosen by City of Virginia Beach. Two stations were assigned within the Town Center district)''
 Rosemont Road: 4.8 miles
 Oceanfront (via Oceana): 12.2 miles
 Oceanfront (via Hilltop): 13.5 miles

As of 2015, a Draft Environmental Impact Statement was published. However, since the City of Virginia Beach and the State of Virginia is paying for the Town Center alternative, there will be no Final Environmental Impact Statement, as that document is made when there is federal money involved. There has been opposition from the citizens of Virginia Beach about costs and using taxpayer money to construct and maintain the line, if built. Citizens of Virginia Beach voted on building the line on November 8, 2016, however, the vote was a no-majority of 57% and as a result, work on light rail has ceased as of December 2016. Had it passed, the extension would have opened between late 2019 and early 2020.

Naval Station Norfolk Extension Study 
In 2012, the City of Norfolk began to study for possibilities for extending their current Tide light rail system to Naval Station Norfolk. Currently the Draft Environmental Study is in development. There are currently six routes in study with two major corridors considered. Mode possibilities are light rail and streetcar. Potential build out of the expansion will commence in the 2020s.

See also 
 Transportation in Hampton Roads

References

External links 
 Hampton Roads Transit

 
Transportation in Hampton Roads
Bus transportation in Virginia
Transit agencies in Virginia
Organizations established in 1999
1999 establishments in Virginia